Alternating Currents may refer to:

Alternating Currents (collection), a collection of science fiction stories by Frederik Pohl
Alternating Currents (album), an album by Spyro Gyra
Alternating current